Kingsley Mensah "Fifi" Baiden (born November 11, 1991) is a Ghanaian former professional footballer who is currently a coach with the UC Santa Barbara Gauchos men's soccer team.

Early life and education 
Baiden was born November 11, 1991, in Ajumako, Ghana.  He was a member of Ghana-based Right to Dream Academy, which he joined around the age of 10.  To help his family financially, Baiden would sell kerosene amongst other odd jobs.  He describes his early life:

He earned a scholarship to Dunn School in Los Olivos, California for Fall 2007.  With Dunn, he captured three-straight MVP awards.  He earned an athletic scholarship to the University of California, Santa Barbara and played four years of college soccer for the UC Santa Barbara Gauchos men's soccer team.

Playing career 
In January 2014, Baiden was drafted in the 3rd round (42nd overall) of the 2014 MLS SuperDraft by the Columbus Crew.  He became the second Right to Dream Academy member to be drafted into MLS after former Dunn School and UCSB teammate Michael Tetteh.  After playing for them in preseason, he was officially signed in February 2014.

Baiden made his professional debut on March 30, 2014, when he appeared on loan for the Columbus Crew's USL Pro affiliate club Dayton Dutch Lions in a 0–3 loss against New York Red Bulls Reserves.

Baiden would return to make one appearance for the Columbus Crew on May 31, 2014.  In July 2014, he was placed on the season-ending injured reserve list due to a torn acetabular labrum.  Baiden was waived at the conclusion of the season.

Coaching career 
Baiden was named as a volunteer assistant coach with the UC Santa Barbara Gauchos men's soccer team in August 2015.

Personal life 
Baiden was named as a Humanitarian Ambassador for MAP International in August 2014 for his efforts in the 2014 West African Ebola virus epidemic.

References

External links 
 
 Columbus Crew player profile
 
 UC Santa Barbara player profile
 Right to Dream Academy player profile

1991 births
Living people
Ghanaian footballers
Ghanaian expatriate footballers
UC Santa Barbara Gauchos men's soccer players
Columbus Crew players
Dayton Dutch Lions players
Association football midfielders
Expatriate soccer players in the United States
Columbus Crew draft picks
People from Central Region (Ghana)
USL Championship players
Major League Soccer players